loveBUZZ is the debut album released by Australian rock band The Hummingbirds.

The album was released on the rooART label in 1989.  It peaked at #31 on the national album charts. The album eventually reached sales of approximately 40,000 copies (exceeding the 35,000 required for Gold record certification in Australia). In October 2010, LoveBUZZ was listed in the book 100 Best Australian Albums.

Reception
AllMusic said the band's, "specialty was a power-pop/alternative rock style that served them well on loveBUZZ", and noted the album would be enjoyed by, "those who like jangly guitar music that's lively and energetic but consistently appealing melodically and harmonically".

In The Sell-In, Craig Mathieson said, "Mitch Easter's disciplined approach had captured a guitar-spangled, fragile sound focussing attention on the voices. LoveBUZZ had enough romantic verve and sheer pop delight, mixed with the band's indie routes, to make the album one of the releases of the year."

Track listing
All tracks written by Simon Holmes unless otherwise noted.
 "Blush" - (Holmes, Robyn St Clare) 3:20 
 "She Knows..." - 4:39 
 "Hollow Inside" - 3:27 
 "Tuesday" (Alannah Russack) - 3:21 
 "Word Gets Around" - 2:56 
 "House Taken Over" - 6:05 
 "Get on Down" - 3:38 
 "Alimony" - 3:46 
 "Everything You Said" (St Clare) - 3:16 
 "Barbarian" - 3:51 
 "Three in the Morning" - 4:32 
 "Michelle as Well" - 3:54 
 "If You Leave" (Holmes, Russack, St Clare, Mark Temple) - 5:34 
 "Miles to Go" (St Clare) - 2:43

Charts

Personnel

The Hummingbirds
 Simon Holmes - guitar, vocals  
 Alannah Russack - guitar, vocals  
 Robyn St. Clare - bass, vocals
 Mark Temple - drums

Production
 Don Bartley - Mastering  
 Paula Bray - Photography  
 Mitch Easter - Producer, Engineer  
 Justine - Assistant Engineer  
 Tony Mott - Photography  
 Paul - Assistant Engineer  
 Jim "The Royster" Perry - Mixing Assistant  
 Quiffboy Polanski - Executive Producer
 Robyn St. Clare - Photography  
 Paul Tatz - Design, Layout Design  
 Mark Williams - Mixing  
 Mark Williams - Engineer

References

1989 debut albums
The Hummingbirds albums
Albums produced by Mitch Easter